Henan University is one of the oldest public and Double First Class Universities in China. It was founded in 1912. In the beginning, its name was the Preparatory School for Further Study in Europe and America. In 1942, its name was changed to National Henan University. After the People's Republic of China was founded, the name Henan University was adopted in 1984.

Henan University is a comprehensive university with 12 branches of learning: agriculture, economics, education, engineering, history, law, liberal arts, management, medicine, philosophy and science. In 2016, the university was selected in the Plan 111, a key project initiated by the Chinese Ministry of Education. In 2017, it is included in the Chinese state Double First Class University Plan and approved as a Double First Class University.

By the end of 2018, Henan University had three campuses. Two campuses (Minglun and JinMing campus) are located in Kaifeng, a famous historic city which was the capital of China during seven different dynasties. The other (Longzi Lake campus) is located in Zhengzhou, the capital of Henan Province and one of the National Central Cities in China. All the campuses cover a total area of 2,200,000 square meters with a room space of 1,470,000 square meters. More than 50,000 students receive a full-time education here, including 10,000 postgraduates and nearly 500 overseas students. Henan University is one of the biggest public universities in the People's Republic of China.

The status of Henan University on some of the world university rankings is as follows. 
CWTS Ranking 2022 of Leiden University ranked Henan University as 468th best global university.  Henan University is ranked 501th to 600th among all universities in the world according to Academic Ranking of World Universities 2022. The US News & World Report Best Global University Ranking 2023 places Henan University at 970th.

History

Founded in 1912, Henan University is one of the oldest universities in China. It was originally named the Preparatory School for Further Study in Europe and America.

Afterwards it was renamed Zhongzhou University (1923), Henan Zhongshan University (1927), Provincial Henan University (1930), and National Henan University (1942). Warlord Feng Yuxiang reportedly played an important role in the university's development, strongly supporting it during his five and a half months-long military governorship of Henan in 1922.

After the founding of the People's Republic of China in 1949, the school was renamed Henan Normal College, then Kaifeng Normal College, and Henan Normal University. The name Henan University was restored in 1984.

Henan University entered the list of the universities which are jointly developed by the provincial government and the Chinese Ministry of Education in 2008. It was a key national project for support the provincial university to be stronger.

When Henan University celebrated its 100th anniversary in 2012, the former Premier Wen Jiabao inscribed congratulations to the university. He autographed an inscription "Promoting Henan University Well to Revitalize Central Plains Education" The same year, the State Council of PRC promulgated new policy to support Henan University to establish a First-class University in China. In 2017, the university became a "Double First Class" university.

Organization 
By the end of 2018, Henan University had 97 undergraduate programs, 42 primary discipline master's programs, 174 sub-discipline master's programs, 20 professional master's programs, a primary discipline doctoral program and 18 doctoral programs and had 15 doctoral research centers.

Among the university's 4,300-strong staff were 11 full-time and half-time academicians as well as 1,200 professors and associate professors. There were more than 60,000 students receiving a full-time education at HENU; among them were more than 10,000 postgraduates and nearly 300 overseas students.

Library 

Henan University Library was formally established in 1912. It claims to be one of the biggest university libraries in Henan Province, with eight service departments, and 36 reading-rooms in which there are more than 6,000 seats.

In 2014, it boasted a collection of more than 7.57 million items, of which 180,000 were hard-bound books of Chinese classics and 170,000 were foreign books.

Campuses 

Henan University comprises two campuses, Minglun and Jinming. The university covers a total area of about 660 acres with a gross floor area of more than 100 million square meters.

Minglun campus 

Minglun, the main and oldest campus of Henan University, is located in Shunhe Hui District, Kaifeng. The Big Auditorium (built in 1931, a palatial architecture in center of the Minglun campus), the monument of imperial examinations (built in the Song dynasty, key cultural heritage) and History Museum (has many valuable historical relics).

Jinming campus 
The Jinming campus is located in Jinming District, Kaifeng. It includes the Key Laboratory of the PRC Ministry of Education. Jinming campus is the biggest campus of Henan University. It was opened in 2002 and most of Institute of science and Engineering are built here.

Longzi Lake campus 
By the end of 2018, Henan University's Longzi Lake campus was still under construction. Longzi Lake campus is located in Zhengzhou city, north of the Longzi Lake. The new International Education College, International Finance College and International Sinology College will be founded here.

Notable alumni

Government and politics 

Liang Guanglie, Minister of PRC National Defense
Wang Quanshu, Chairman of the Central Committee of the Communist Party of China's Henan Committee
Yuan Baohua, President of Renmin University of China
Wang Guoquan, Ambassador of China to East Germany, Poland, Australia and Italy

Humanities and social sciences 
Zhao Jiuzhang, founder of Chinese dynamical meteorology

Natural sciences and mathematics 
Gao Yaojie, Chinese gynecologist and AIDS activist

Literature and art 
Deng Tuo, Chinese poet, intellectual and journalist
Yan Lianke, Chinese novelist, author of Dream of Ding Village and Enjoyment
Yao Xueyin, Chinese novelist, author of Li Zicheng

References

Bibliography

External links

HENU website (Chinese)
HENU website (English) (last updated in 2011)

 
Universities and colleges in Kaifeng
Educational institutions established in 1912
1912 establishments in China